Elephant9 (established 2006 in Oslo, Norway) is a Norwegian progressive/neo-psychedelic/jazz-rock trio which formed in 2006 under the name Storløkken/Eilertsen/Lofthus, for the members of the band, namely Ståle Storløkken (keyboard), Nikolai Eilertsen (bass) and Torstein Lofthus (drums), but changed the name to Elephant9 after the first year together.

Biography
The trio released their debut album Dodovoodoo in 2008, and followed up with Walk the Nile in 2010, both on the label Rune Grammofon. Walk the Nile was awarded Spellemannprisen 2010 in the class Jazz, and has drawn considerable praise from both the jazz and rock communities worldwide. They appeared at scenes in London with Motorpsycho in 2010.

Their third studio album Atlantis, released in 2012, reinforced by the Swedish prog-rock guitarist veteran Reine Fiske, was accompanied by a series of concert performances at Kongsberg Jazz Festival, and other Norwegian festivals like Vossajazz and Nattjazz, and stages like "Union Scene" and "Victoria, Najonal Jazzscene".

Honors
Spellemannprisen 2010 in the class Jazz for the album Walk the Nile

Discography
2008: Dodovoodoo (Rune Grammofon)
2010: Walk the Nile (Rune Grammofon)
2011: Live at the BBC (Rune Grammofon)
2012: Atlantis (Rune Grammofon), with Reine Fiske
2015: Silver Mountain (Rune Grammofon), with Reine Fiske
2018: Greatest Show On Earth (Rune Grammofon)
2019: Psychedelic Backfire I (Rune Grammofon)
2019: Psychedelic Backfire II (Rune Grammofon)
2019: Psychedelic Backfire III (Rune Grammofon)
2021: Arrival of the New Elders (Rune Grammofon)

References

External links
Artist page on Rune Grammafon
Artist page on Discogs

Norwegian experimental musical groups
Musical groups established in 2006
2006 establishments in Norway
Musical groups from Oslo
Spellemannprisen winners
Rune Grammofon artists